The northern leatherside chub (Lepidomeda copei) is a cyprinid fish of western North America.

This is a small fish, reported at up to 15 cm (6 in) in length, but more typically half that. The tapered body is covered with very small scales over a skin with a leathery texture, inspiring the common name. Overall color is bluish dorsally and silver ventrally; males are distinguished by patches of orange-red color on the axils of the paired fins, at the base of the anal fin, and along the lower lobe of the tail, as well as golden-red specks at the upper end of the gill opening, and between eye and upper jaw. Unlike most other minnows, both dorsal and anal fins have eight rays.

Its habitat is cooler creeks and rivers with moderate currents, where the adults congregate in pools or riffles, while the young favor quiet areas with brush near the shore.

Northern leatherside chubs range from the upper Snake River system in Idaho and Wyoming, where they were probably introduced as angling bait fish, south to the Sevier River in Utah, being commonly found in the rivers draining into the Great Salt Lake and Utah Lake. They have been introduced into the Colorado River system, such as Strawberry Reservoir and Price River in Utah. Although it is still to be determined whether the fish introduced to these sites are Northern leatherside chubs or the Southern leatherside chub.

This chub has been extensively used as fishing bait.

Originally named Squalius copei and later placed in Gila, this chub was separated into a monotypic genus in 1945. This placement was eventually verified using mtDNA 12S rRNA sequence data. It seems a fairly close relative of the spinedaces (genus Lepidomeda) and the spikedaces (genus Meda), but the phylogeny and indeed the validity of the proposed "plagopterin" clade is insufficiently resolved (Simons & Mayden 1997), and Fishbase now classifies it as a species of Lepidomeda as well as splitting the leatherside chubs into northern and southern species.

References

  (1997): Phylogenetic Relationships of the Creek Chubs and the Spine-Fins: an Enigmatic Group of North American Cyprinid Fishes (Actinopterygii: Cyprinidae). Cladistics 13(3): 187–205.  (HTML abstract)
  (1987): Fishes of the Great Basin: 173–175. University of Nevada Press, Reno.
 Johnson, J. B., Dowling, T. E., & Belk, M. C. (2004). Neglected taxonomy of rare desert fishes: congruent evidence for two species of leatherside chub. Systematic Biology, 53(6), 841–855.
 Page, L. M., Espinosa-Pérez, H., Findley, L. T., Gilbert, C. R., Lea, R. N., Mandrak, N. E., ... & Nelson, J. S. (2013). Common and scientific names of fishes from the United States, Canada, and Mexico. American Fisheries Society, Special Publication, 34.

Chubs (fish)
Chub, Leatherside
Freshwater fish of the United States
Fish described in 1881
Taxa named by David Starr Jordan 
Lepidomeda